Eric Schembri (born 30 April 1955) was a professional footballer who played as a striker for Gżira United and Sliema Wanderers. He also played in full international matches for the Malta national team. including a UEFA Euro 1980 qualifying match against West Germany on 27 February 1980.

Following his playing career, Schembri became a football manager, leading Mdina Knights during the 2006 season. As of 2010, he was serving as Technical Director for the Knights.

Personal life
Schembri is the son of former Sliema Wanderers and Malta international midfielder Salvinu Schembri, and is the father to Malta's international attacking midfielder André Schembri.

References

External links
Mdina Knights official website

Living people
1955 births
Maltese footballers
Association football forwards
Malta international footballers
Gżira United F.C. players
Sliema Wanderers F.C. players
Schembri family